The Ghana national basketball team represents Ghana in international competitions. It is administered by the Ghana Basketball Association (GBBA).

Ghana's senior national team has till date only played friendly games, despite its potentials and to the dismay of its fans.
Ghanaian basketball players have played in some of the world's strongest leagues such as the US-based NCAA or the Spanish Liga ACB.   
The country does have a U-18 national team that competes at the FIBA Africa Under-18 Championship.

Besides a youth national team, Ghana also features a 3x3 basketball team. On 2019/01/01 it tranked 8th in Africa for the male side and 16th for the females.

Ghana is Africa's most populous nation to never qualify for a major international basketball tournament, apart from youth and 3x3 basketball tournaments. They were scheduled to take part in AfroBasket 2021 qualification, with its group games being cancelled later.

Competitive record

Summer Olympics
never entered qualifying round

World Championship
never entered qualifying round

FIBA Africa Championship
never entered qualifying round

African Games

never entered qualifying round

Notable players
Because of the unavailability of a national team, Ghanaian-born basketball players often opt to represent other national teams.

Current notable Ghanaian-born players include:

See also
Ghana women's national basketball team
Ghana national under-18 basketball team

References
Fiba3x3.com player Rankings

External links
Basketball Ghana | Your one stop for all basketball news in Ghana
Presentation on Facebook

Men's national basketball teams
Basketball
Basketball in Ghana
1962 establishments in Ghana